Mirjaber Pichab (also Romanized as Mīrjāber Pīchāb) is a village in Kuh Mareh Khami Rural District, in the Central District of Basht County, Kohgiluyeh and Boyer-Ahmad Province, Iran. At the 2006 census, its population was 17, in 4 families.

References 

Populated places in Basht County